House Of Krazees is an American hip hop group. Formed in 1992 in Detroit, Michigan, they are most associated with the horrorcore subgenre. The group consists of rappers The R.O.C., Mr. Bones and Hektic, the latter of which also perform as a duo under the name Twiztid. After a lineup change and a 14 year break-up, the original lineup reformed in 2013 and is currently signed with Majik Ninja Entertainment.

Biography

1992-1999: Early career

House of Krazees was formed by friends Bryan Jones, Paul Methric and Jamie Spaniolo out of a shared love of horror films and hip hop music. Jones adopted the stage name R.O.C., Methric performed as EXP and Spaniolo as Big J. Methric and Spaniolo later changed their names to Hektic and Mr. Bones respectively. House of Krazees' catalog was only released on Compact Cassette until the group signed to Latnem Entertainment. Problems between House of Krazees and Latnem led the group to leave the label following its 1996 album, Head Trauma. That year, the group was scheduled to tour with Insane Clown Posse and Myzery, serving as an opening act for ICP. The tour was cancelled after Insane Clown Posse was dropped by Hollywood Records. They did tour with ICP and Myzery after the Great Milenko tour finally started after Island records bought the contract from Hollywood records. House of Krazees was only on a select number of dates because of tensions within the group. Methric and Spaniolo left House of Krazees in 1997, due to conflicts with the group's manager, Walter Stepanenko.

R.O.C. continued to perform under the House of Krazees name with rapper Skrapz until 1999. R.O.C. and Skrapz also performed under the name "HaLFBrEEd".

Post-split

Twiztid

After the split, Methric and Spaniolo sent a demo tape to Insane Clown Posse member Joseph Bruce. The demo contained the tracks "2nd Hand Smoke," "Diemuthafuckadie," and "How Does It Feel?" Bruce was extremely impressed, invited Methric and Spaniolo to perform on 'The House of Horrors Tour', and signed them to Psychopathic Records. Before the tour kicked off, Bruce, Methric and Spaniolo decided on a name that they felt would fit the duo: Twiztid. Twiztid was signed to Psychopathic from 1997 until 2012.

R.O.C.'s solo career

R.O.C. later became the hype man for Psychopathic Records artist Blaze Ya Dead Homie. R.O.C. appears on Blaze's 2007 album Clockwork Gray, on the tracks "Ill Connect", "Inside Looking Out" and "E.O.D." R.O.C. signed to Hatchet House in 2008 and released an EP, Welcome To The Darkside.

In 2009, R.O.C. announced that he was retiring from music. In 2012, he came out of retirement and appeared on Prozak's EP Nocturnal, contributing a verse on "Knuckle Up". R.O.C. also appeared alongside Methric and Spaniolo on Psychopathic's fourth "Psypher", released in October 2012, marking an unofficial reunion of House of Krazees. In 2013 R.O.C appeared on Twiztids mixtape A New Nightmare on the track "Monstrosity" which was labeled as a House of Krazees song. A greatest hits album entitled Casket Cutz was released on October 23, 2013.

2013-present: Reunion
In 2013, The R.O.C appeared on Twiztid's A New Nightmare EP on the track "Monstrosity", which was labeled as a House of Krazees song. A greatest hits album entitled Casket Cutz was released on October 23, 2013 and features 12 songs from all previous releases plus a bonus song previously unreleased from the vault. They also had an appearance on the song "Disgusted" off of The R.O.C.'s third album Digital Voodoo, which was released on April 14, 2017. On February 12, 2018, they released their comeback single "Death 4Any1 Who..." on Twiztid's official YouTube channel. In a mid March 2018 live video on facebook Jamie Madrox said that he, Monoxide and The R.O.C. have been working with Fritz Von Kosky (aka Fritz The Cat). Not saying it was for HOK, but hinted at it saying "since FTC produced Death 4 Any1 Who we've had a few more songs he's been working on for the 3 of us". Which at that point FTC told Jamie not to say anymore, creating speculation that HOK would be releasing a full length album in 2018. It was announced on September 7th, 2018 that the House of Krazees will release a limited edition cassette box set including all 5 original HOK albums, both Mr. Bones solo releases, and The R.O.C.'s X-Posed on December 1st, 2018.

Discography

 Home Sweet Home (October 1, 1993)
 Home Bound (1994)
 Season Of The Pumpkin (1994)
 Outbreed (1995)
 Head Trauma (October 1, 1996)
 Collector's Edition '97 (1997)
 The Night They Came Home (1999)
 Evolution (2001)
 Casket Cutz (2013)
 Post Apocalyptic World (2018)

References

Detroit hip hop groups
Horrorcore groups
Majik Ninja Entertainment artists
Musical groups established in 1993
Musical groups disestablished in 1997
Musical groups reestablished in 2013
Rappers from Detroit
Twiztid
Underground hip hop groups
1993 establishments in Michigan